The Geffen Award (פרס גפן) is an annual literary award given by the Israeli Society for Science Fiction and Fantasy since 1999, and presented at the ICon festival, the annual Science Fiction and Fantasy Convention, It is named in honour of editor and translator Amos Geffen, who was one of the society's founders.

Categories 
The Geffen awards are given out in six categories:
 Best Original Science Fiction or Fantasy Novel (since 2003)
 Best Original Science Fiction or Fantasy Short Story (since 2002)
 Best Translated Science Fiction Novel.
 Best Translated Fantasy Novel.
 Best Translated Book for Children or Young Adults (since 2008).
 Best Translation of a Science Fiction or Fantasy Novel (since 2008, given in collaboration with the Israeli Translator's Association).

List of winners by year

2022 
 Best Original Science Fiction or Fantasy Novel: What Others Think in Me, Yoav Blum. 
 Best Original Science Fiction or Fantasy Short Story: Dust, Keren Landsman.
 Best Translated Science Fiction Novel: Not awarded.
 Best Translated Fantasy Novel: The Once and Future Witches, Alix E. Harrow.
 Best Translated Book for Children or Young Adults: Tik-Tok of Oz, L. Frank Baum.

2021 
 Best Original Science Fiction or Fantasy Novel: The World Beneath the Rug, Lee Evron. 
 Best Original Science Fiction or Fantasy Short Story: To Open (or: The Light in The Keyway), Hila Benyovits-Hoffman.
 Best Translated Science Fiction Novel: The Ballad of Songbirds and Snakes, Suzanne Collins
 Best Translated Fantasy Novel: The Ten Thousand Doors of January, Alix E. Harrow.
 Best Translated Book for Children or Young Adults: Children of Blood and Bone, Tomi Adeyemi.

2020 
 Best Original Science Fiction or Fantasy Novel: Satisfying the dragon, Masha Tzur Gluzman.
 Best Original Science Fiction or Fantasy Short Story: Blue iceberg beer, Rotem Baruchin.
 Best Translated Science Fiction Novel: Not awarded. 
 Best Translated Fantasy Novel: Spinning Silver, Naomi Novik.
 Best Translated Book for Children or Young Adults: Cuckoo Song, Frances Hardinge.

2019 
 Best Original Science Fiction or Fantasy Novel: Heart of the Circle, Keren Landsman.
 Best Original Science Fiction or Fantasy Short Story: Dragon Bound, Rotem Baruchin.
 Best Translated Science Fiction Novel: Artemis.
 Best Translated Fantasy Novel: The Alloy of Law.
 Best Translated Book for Children or Young Adults: The Ship of the Dead.

2017 
 Best Original Science Fiction or Fantasy Novel: The Unswitchable, Yoav Blum.
 Best Original Science Fiction or Fantasy Short Story: Lost and Found, Rotem Baruchin.
 Best Translated Science Fiction Novel: Earth Afire and Earth Awakens Translated by Boaz weiss.
 Best Translated Fantasy Novel: Harry Potter and the Cursed Child Translated by Gili Bar-Hillel.
 Best Translated Book for Children or Young Adults: The Hidden Oracle Translated by Yael Achmon.

2016 
 Best Translated Science Fiction Novel: Redshirts , John Scalzi  Translated by Zafrir Grosman, Opus Press
 Best Translated Fantasy Novel: Fool’s Assassin, Robin Hobb  Translated by Zafrir Grosman, Opus Press
 Best Translated YA Book: The Blood of Olympus, Rick Riordan  Translated by Yael Achmon, Graff publishing
 Best Original Science Fiction or Fantasy Short Story: Requiem to Mathew, Avial Tochterman
 Best Original Science Fiction or Fantasy Novel: Lake of Shadows, Roni Gelbfish, Gold Fish

2015 
 Best Translated Science Fiction Novel: The Martian, Andy Weir  Translated by Didi Chanoch, The Armchair Publishing House
 Best Translated Fantasy Novel: The Ocean at the End of the Lane, Neil Gaiman  Translated by Didi Chanoch, The Armchair Publishing House
 Best Translated YA Book: Ozma of Oz and Dorothy and the Wizard in Oz, L Frank Baum  Translated by Gili Bar-Hillel Semo, Utz Books
 Best Original Science Fiction or Fantasy Short Story: Five Four Three Two One, Five Four Three Two One
 Best Original Science Fiction or Fantasy Novel: Broken Skies, Keren Landsman,  Sial Publishing

2014 
 Best Translated Science Fiction Novel: The Devil's Alphabet, Daryl Gregory  Translated by Didi Chanoch, Graff publishing
 Best Translated Fantasy Novel: Going Postal, Terry Pratchett  Translated by Vered Tochterman, Opus press
 Best Translated YA Book: The Amazing Maurice and His Educated Rodents, Terry Pratchett  Translated by Yonatan Bar, Sial Publishing
 Best Original Science Fiction or Fantasy Short Story: Whiskey in a Jar, Rotem Baruchin  Published in "Once upon a future"
 Best Original Science Fiction or Fantasy Novel: Every Story is a Sudden Cat, Gabriella Avigur  Rotem Kinneret Zmora Bitan Publishing

2013
 Best Translated Science Fiction Novel: Tower of Glass,  Robert Silverberg  Translated by Omer Kabir, Moby Dick publishing
 Best Translated Fantasy Novel: A dance with dragons, George R.R. Martin  Translated by Tzafrir Grosman, Opus publishing
 Best Translated YA Book: Mockingjay, Suzanne Collins  Translated by Yael Achmon, Kinneret Zmora Bitan Publishing
 Best Original Science Fiction or Fantasy Short Story: Cappuccino, To Go, Rotem Baruchin  Published in "Once upon a future" vol. 4
 Best Original Science Fiction or Fantasy Novel: Demons in Agripas Street, Hagai Dagan  Kinneret Zmora Bitan Publishing

2012 
 Best Translated Science Fiction Novel: Catching Fire, Suzanne Collins  Translated by Yael Achmon, Kinneret Publishing
 Best Translated Fantasy Novel: The Son of Neptune, Rick Riordan  Translated by Yael Achmon, Graff publishing
 Best OriginalScience Fiction or Fantasy Short Story (joint win):
 And then there was winter, Hadas Misgav  Published in Don’t Panic! Online magazine
 Alone, in the dark, Keren Landsman  Published as part of the online anthology “The World of Susan”, Meorot convention website.
 Best Original Science Fiction or Fantasy Novel What if (Herzl said), Yoav Avni,  Zmora-Bitan Publishing

2011 
 Best Translated Science Fiction Novel: The Hunger Games, Suzanne Collins  Translated by Yael Achmon, Kinneret Publishing
 Best Translated Fantasy Novel: I Shall Wear Midnight, Terry Pratchett  Translated by Yonatan Bar, Kidmat Eden Publishing
 Best Original SF&F Short Story: The Heisenberg Gorgon, Keren Landsman  Published in Don’t Panic! Online magazine
 Best Original SF&F Novel: Mesopotamia – Silence of the Stars, Yehuda Israely & Dor Raveh  Am-Oved Publishing

2010 
 Best Translated Science Fiction Novel: Isaac Asimov’s Collected Short Stories– Vol. I, Isaac Asimov  Translated by Rami Shalhevet, Moby Dick Publishing
 Best Translated Fantasy Novel: Nation, Terry Pratchett  Translated by Yonatan Bar, Kidmat Eden Publishing
 Best Original SF&F Short Story: Dr. Watson & Mr. Holmes – or – The Curse of the Penningtons, Vered Tochterman  Published in “Once upon a future” anthology, Vol 1
 Best Original SF&F Novel: To Be (Chong Levi's Fifth), Yoav Avni,  Kinneret Zmora-Bitan Publishing

2009 
 Best Translated Science Fiction Novel: This Immortal, Roger Zelazny  Translated by Raz Greenberg, Moby Dick Publishing
 Best Translated Fantasy Novel: A Hatful of Sky, Terry Pratchett  Translated by Yonatan Bar, Kidmat Eden Publishing
 Best Original SF&F Short Story: The Phoenix Planet, Yael Michaeli  Published in Don't Panic! Online Magazine
 Best Original SF&F Novel: Hydromania, Asaf Gavron Keter Publishing

2008 
 Best Translated Science Fiction Novel: I Am Legend, Richard Matheson.  Translated by Yael Inbar, Yanshuf Publishing.
 Best Translated Fantasy Novel: The Wee Free Men, Terry Pratchett.  Translated by Yonatan Bar, Kidmat Eden Publishing.
 Best Translated YA or Children SF&F Book: Harry Potter and the Deathly Hallows, J. K. Rowling. Translated by Gili Bar-Hillel Semo, Yediot Books Publishing.
 Best Original SF&F Short Story: Where Books are Lost, Lili Daie. Published in Don't Panic! Online Magazine
 Best Original SF&F Novel: The Water Between the Worlds, Hagar Yanai. Keter Publishing
 Best Translation of a SF&F book: Gili Bar-Hillel Semo for translating the book: Harry Potter and the Deathly Hallows by J. K. Rowling, Yediot Books Publishing

2007 
 Best Translated Science Fiction Novel: Old Man's War, John Scalzi  Translated by Raz Greenberg, Yanshuf Publishing
 Best Translated Fantasy Novel: Jonathan Strange & Mr. Norrell, Susanna Clarke Translated by Vered Tochterman, Yanshuf Publishing
 Best Original SF&F Short Story: In the Mirror, Rotem Baruchin The Tenth Dimension Magazine, issue 29
 Best Original Novel: The Whale of Babylon, Hagar Yanai Keter Publishing

2006 
 Best Translated Science Fiction Novel: Spin, Robert Charles Wilson Translated by Didi Chanoch, Graff Publishing
 Best Translated Fantasy Novel: Anansi Boys, Neil Gaiman Translated by Vered Tochterman, Opus Press
 Best Original  SF&F Short Story: East of Eden, Hagay Averbuch The Israeli Society for SF&F Online Magazine

2005 
 Best Translated Science Fiction Novel: Childhood's End, Arthur C. Clarke Translated by Didi Chanoch, Yanshuf Publishing
 Best Translated Fantasy Novel: Transformation, Carol Berg Translated by Didi Chanoch, Graff Publishing
 Best Original SF&F Short Story: The Perfect Girl, Guy Hasson Chalomot Be'aspamia magazine
 Best Original Novel: End's World, Ofir Touche Gafla Keter Publishing

2004 
 Best Translated Science Fiction Novel: Warchild, Karin Lowachee Translated by Inbal Sagiv, Opus Press
 Best Translated Fantasy Novel:  Smoke and Mirrors, Neil Gaiman Translated by Yael Achmon, Opus Press
 Best Original SF&F Short Story: Dragon Checkpoint, Rami Shalheveth The Tenth Dimension magazine

2003 
 Best Translated Science Fiction Novel: Solaris, Stanislaw Lem Translated by Aharon Hauptman, Keter publishing house
 Best Translated Fantasy Novel:  American Gods, Neil Gaiman Translated by Rechavia Berman, Opus Press
 Best Original SF&F Short story: All-of-Me(TM), Guy Hasson  Chalomot Beaspamia magazine
 Best Original SF&F Novel: Sometimes It's Different, Vered Tochterman Opus Press

2002 
 Best Translated Science Fiction Novel: Fahrenheit 451, Ray Bradbury Translated by Noa Manheim, Odyssey Publishing House
 Best Translated Fantasy Novel: A Storm of Swords, George R. R. Martin Translated by David Chanoch, Opus Press
 Best Original SF&F Short Story: Me and Grandma Go Shopping, Hamutal Levin Bli Panika

2001 
 Best Translated Science Fiction Novel: Ender's Shadow, Orson Scott Card Translated by Rechavia Berman, Opus Press
 Best Translated Fantasy Novel:  The Anubis Gates, Tim Powers Translated by Vered Tochterman, Opus Press

2000 
 Best Translated Science Fiction Novel: Dune: House Atreides, Brian Herbert, Kevin J. Anderson Translated by Dorit Landes, Am Oved Publishing House.
 Best Translated Fantasy Novel: Stardust, Neil Gaiman Translated by Ornit Shachar, Opus Press.

1999 
 Best Translated Science Fiction Novel: Pastwatch, Orson Scott Card Translated by Rechavia Berman, Opus Press.
 Best Translated Fantasy Novel: Swords and Deviltry, Fritz Leiber Translated by Adva Zeltser, Opus Press.

External links 
 Geffen Award English page at the official awards site

Israeli literary awards
Science fiction awards
Israeli science fiction
Israeli speculative fiction awards
Lists of Israeli award winners
Awards established in 1999
1999 establishments in Israel